WWAY (channel 3) is a television station in Wilmington, North Carolina, United States, affiliated with ABC, CBS, and The CW Plus. Owned by Morris Multimedia, the station has studios on Magnolia Village Way in Leland, and its transmitter is located west of Winnabow in Town Creek Township.

History
WWAY signed on the air on October 30, 1964, as the second television station in Wilmington, 10½ years after NBC affiliate WECT (channel 6). It was originally owned by Cape Fear Telecasting, a firm controlled by local interests. The station's first studios were located on the 10th floor of the Murchison Building in downtown Wilmington. Logically, it should have signed on as a CBS affiliate. However, it has been an ABC affiliate from the very first day. This was somewhat unusual for a two-station market, especially one of Wilmington's size. For most of its first 20 years in television, ABC was relegated to secondary status on existing stations in most two-station markets. However, at the time channel 3 signed on, no ABC affiliate put even a grade B signal into Wilmington. In contrast, WBTW in Florence, South Carolina, put a fairly strong grade B signal into the area, and that station consequently remained CBS' affiliate of record for southeastern North Carolina until WJKA-TV (channel 26, now WSFX-TV, a Fox affiliate) signed on 20 years later; the former continued to serve some portions of the market until WILM-LD switched its affiliation to CBS in 2000. Cape Fear thus figured that if it signed with ABC, it would not get much local competition.

Cape Fear sold WWAY to Clay Broadcasting (later to become Clay Communications) in 1968. In 1969, the station moved its studios to a new building a few blocks north on Front Street that was the first piece of a redevelopment of the north end of downtown. In 1981, a military jet destroyed the WWAY broadcast tower near Winnabow. As part of the divestiture of the company's newspaper and television properties, on April 30, 1987, Clay sold its WWAY and its four sister television stations—NBC affiliates KJAC-TV (now Dabl affiliate KBTV-TV) in Beaumont–Port Arthur, Texas, KFDX-TV in Wichita Falls, Texas and ABC affiliate WAPT in Jackson, Mississippi—to New York City-based Price Communications Corporation for $60 million; the sale was approved by the FCC on June 23. In 1988, Price sold WWAY to Adams Communications. Adams then sold the station to CLG Media in 1993, who then flipped it to Hillside Broadcasting in 1995. Hillside then sold WWAY to Cosmos Broadcasting, a subsidiary of the Liberty Corporation, in 1999. That company sold off its insurance interests two years later, bringing WWAY directly under the Liberty banner. In 2004, WWAY, following the lead of then-owner Liberty's ABC-affiliated stations, preempted a showing of the 1998 movie Saving Private Ryan.

In 2005, Liberty merged with Raycom Media, which already owned WECT. That company could not keep both stations as Federal Communications Commission (FCC) duopoly rules do not allow common ownership of two of the four largest stations in a single market. As a result, Raycom opted to keep the longer-established and higher-rated WECT and spun off WWAY to current owner Morris Multimedia in 2006. However, the station retained the Liberty-era logo that was introduced in 2003. On May 8, 2008, the FCC announced that Wilmington had been selected as a test market for the 2009 national digital television transition. Five stations in Wilmington, including WWAY, also agreed to voluntarily cease analog broadcasting on September 8. Channel 3 made its transition from analog to digital at Noon on that date.  On June 15, WWAY started broadcasting the Retro Television Network on its second digital channel. This had previously served as a 24-hour local weather channel.

In September 2013, WWAY announced that it would add The CW on a digital subchannel. The new channel launched on September 30, 2013, under the branding "Cape Fear CW". The addition of The CW pushed RTV to channel 3.3, before Cozi TV took over the tertiary frequency in January 2015. On March 30, 2016, CBS announced that it would move its local affiliation to WWAY-DT2 from WILM-LD on January 1, 2017. The move shifted Cape Fear CW to 3.3, thereby bumping Cozi TV from that spot.

In March 2017, the station's parent announced the purchase of the former Thunder Alley bowling center in Leland, to be converted to the station's new state-of-the-art broadcast studios. On April 29, 2018, WWAY began on-air programming from the Leland facilities at 1224 Magnolia Village Way, completing the move from the 615 North Front Street studios in Downtown Wilmington that the station had occupied since 1969.

News operation
Rival WECT has been the longtime market leader in terms of attaining consistent viewership and higher Nielsen ratings. WWAY is the only other Wilmington station that produces local news since WILM-LD did not operate a news department of its own while it was affiliated with CBS (unlike most big three network-affiliated television stations). However, that outlet does simulcast some newscasts from WRAL-TV in Raleigh with Wilmington-specific weather inserts (that are taped in advance), but there is no news coverage of the Cape Fear region. In order to provide WILM with more localized coverage, a news share agreement was established with WWAY allowing this ABC outlet to produce a live newscast weeknights at 7 p.m. This half-hour production aired from March 10, 2008, until February 27, 2009.

On August 1, 2009, WWAY stopped airing weekend newscasts, leaving WECT as the only option for viewers. Although it would eventually bring back a Sunday night show at 11 p.m. on October 3, 2010, WECT retained its ratings and viewership dominance throughout all dayparts. On January 6, 2014, WWAY launched a thirty-minute weeknight newscast on WWAY-DT2 under the title Cape Fear CW Primetime News at 10. This is the first competition to Fox affiliate WSFX-TV, which has a well-established nightly newscast at 10 p.m. produced by WECT. Unlike most ABC outlets, WWAY does not air a full two-hour weekday morning show (its Good Morning Carolina program is only seen from 5:30 a.m. until 7 a.m.). It also does not carry a 4 p.m. newscast during the week. WWAY is one of a few ABC affiliates to air paid programming on weekday mornings and afternoons.

On January 2, 2017, WWAY began producing a midday newscast and a full-hour 7 p.m. newscast for WWAY-DT2, when the subchannel became a CBS affiliate. The 10 p.m. newscast currently on WWAY-DT2 moved with the rest of the CW Plus schedule to WWAY-DT3. In addition, WWAY-DT2 simulcasts all of the main WWAY subchannel's other newscasts.

Notable current on–air staff
 Brett Blizzard – Full Court Press host (sports)
 Trot Nixon – Fifth Quarter host (sports)

Subchannels
The station's digital signal is multiplexed:

After CBS moved to WWAY-DT2 from WILM-LD (which became an independent station), the multiplex bandwidth was switched around so that the main ABC signal continued to be carried in 720p, with WWAY-DT2 broadcasting in CBS' default 1080i resolution. In August 2021, WWAY-DT3's CW feed was upgraded to high definition. Prior to this, the feed was only carried in HD on select cable providers.

Coverage
In North Carolina, WWAY is still carried in Rowland which is part of the Myrtle Beach–Florence market. Rowland and all of Robeson County used to be part of the Wilmington market and even earlier the Raleigh–Durham–Fayetteville DMA. Lumberton, the county seat of Robeson County, used to carry WWAY as well until around 1999. Jacksonville still carries WWAY even though it is part of the Greenville–New Bern–Washington market. In South Carolina, WWAY used to be carried in Myrtle Beach and Surfside Beach up until the late-1990s. It was carried along the South Carolina borderbelt communities near the North Carolina state line but no longer is. WWAY is not carried on satellite outside of the Wilmington market. In Brunswick County, the station is carried on Focus Broadband channel 5.

References

 Digital TV transition kicks off in Wilmington NC, LA Times, September 8, 2008

External links

 WWAY
 WWAY-DT2 CBS
 WWAY-DT3 "Cape Fear CW"

1964 establishments in North Carolina
ABC network affiliates
CBS network affiliates
The CW affiliates
Morris Multimedia
Television channels and stations established in 1964
WAY